Mate Ivan Joseph Jakich (31 March 1940 – 2 March 2010) was a New Zealand rugby union player who represented Auckland as a loose forward.

Biography
Jakich was born in Ōtorohanga in 1940, and educated at St Peter's College. He played rugby for his school as a student in the 1950s and later in life, as an old boy, despite the onset of a serious arthritic condition, he coached the St Peter's College 1st XV alongside Brother John Prendergast during the 1970s.

Jakich played rugby for the University of Auckland as a student. He played "hundreds" of games for the Marist Auckland senior team and was selected by Fred Allen to represent the Auckland province and played in 61 games for the Auckland team which, from 1960 to 1963,  defended the Ranfurly Shield a record 25 times. Jakich's playing style was typified by his "rampaging runs". Allen observed that Jakich was strong, moved around quickly and was easily lifted in lineouts.  He took part in the game, Auckland v South Africa, at Eden Park, Auckland on 30 July 1966. As a personality, Jakich was considered unforgettable and totally distinctive, full of courage and good humour.

References

1940 births
2010 deaths
New Zealand people of Croatian descent
People educated at St Peter's College, Auckland
University of Auckland alumni
New Zealand rugby union players
People from Ōtorohanga
Auckland rugby union players
Rugby union flankers
New Zealand rugby union coaches
Rugby union players from Waikato